Ludwig Mecklinger (1919–1994) was a German politician who was one of the health ministers of East Germany and a member of the ruling party Socialist Unity Party (SED). He had degrees both in medicine and law.

Early life and education
Mecklinger was born in Buchdorf, near Donauwörth, on 14 November 1919. He studied medicine in Leipzig, Hamburg and Berlin in the period between 1939 and 1944. In 1944 he was drafted into the German army and was arrested by the American forces. He was detained in a war camp in Traunstein. In 1945 he was released and joined the SED. In 1954 he also obtained a degree in law from the German Academy for State and Law in Potsdam.

Career
Between 1945 and 1947 Mecklinger was in the provincial government of Saxony-Anhalt responsible for disease control. Between 1948 and 1952 he served the minister of labor and health of the Land Saxony-Anhalt. In the period 1952–1954 he acted as the deputy chairman of the central committee of the German Red Cross. From 1954 to 1957 he was the deputy chief of the medical service of the Kasernierte Volkspolizei and then of the  National People's Army. In 1957 he was named as the head of the military medical section at the University of Greifswald which he held until 1964. Mecklinger began to work for the Ministry for State Security or Stasi in 1962. In 1964 he was promoted to the professorship and was appointed deputy dean of the military  medicine. The same year he was also named as the vice health minister. 

In 1969 Mecklinger was appointed secretary of state and first vice health minister. In 1971 he was named as the health minister and replaced Max Sefrin in the post. Mecklinger was the first physician who held the office in East Germany. He served in the cabinet led by Willi Stoph and was in office until his resignation in 1989. Klaus Thiemann replaced Mecklinger as health minister. In the period 1981–1988 Mecklinger served as a deputy at the East German Parliament. Between 1986 and 1988 he was a member of the central committee of the SED.

Death and awards
He died in Berlin on 22 June 1994. Mecklinger  was the recipient of the bronze, silver and gold medals of the National People's Army and the gold medal for services to people and fatherland in 1974. In 1984 he was awarded with the Scharnhorst Order.

References

External links

20th-century German physicians
1919 births
1994 deaths
Government ministers of East Germany
Members of the 9th Volkskammer
Members of the Central Committee of the Socialist Unity Party of Germany
German Army personnel of World War II
German prisoners of war in World War II held by the United States
People from Donau-Ries
Stasi officers
Academic staff of the University of Greifswald